Sun Electric may stand for:

 Sun Electric (band), electronic music group
 SUN Electric, now part of Snap-on Equipment